Just a Matter of Slime is the second studio album by American rapper YNW Melly. It was released on August 13, 2021, by 300 Entertainment and Atlantic Records. The album features guest appearances from Lil Uzi Vert, YNW Gunna, Hotboii, Kodak Black, Lil Baby, Lil Durk, Queen Naija, Young Thug, Lil Tjay, Kevin Gates, Future, and Tee Grizzley.

Background
While in prison, Melly said that the album would be released in July 2021. At first the album was originally meant to be released on July 30, 2021, with ten tracks, however, it was pushed back to add more tracks; on August 6, it was announced that the album would be released on August 13, 2021 and that it would feature 12 tracks. Five out of the 12 tracks of the album were released as singles and four of them have music videos.

On August 6, 2021, Melly's social media confirmed the release date and released the cover art. The album title is a reference to Melly's incarceration; he references "Just a Matter of Slime" as being released soon. The album cover shows a snake looping around a Patek Philippe with some white VVS diamonds on them. Melly also confirmed on his Instagram from a video call from jail that he had been helping to produce this album from jail while awaiting his murder trial.

Critical reception

Just a Matter of Slime received inadequate reviews from music critics. TiVo Staff from AllMusic stated that, " the project features old vocals from the pre-2019 vault -- and as a result, the album's features tend to take the main stage." He further notes that, "unfortunately, Melly's own vocals don't quite match the energy of his contemporaries," noting that, "much of the album lacks the outlandish personality that made him so popular in the late 2010s." Concluding his review, Staff stated, "When combined with uninspired and sonically incohesive production, these tracks result in a lethargic layover tape, rather than a second full album."

Commercial performance
Just a Matter of Slime debuted at number eleven on the US Billboard 200 on August 28, 2021, with 26,000 album-equivalent units. It is YNW Melly's second highest-peaking album following his November 2019 Melly vs. Melvin.

Track listing

Sample credits
 "Best Friends 4L" uses the same instrumental as "No Holidays" written and performed by YNW Melly.

Personnel

 Chris Athens – mastering 
 Christian "The Scientist" Perez – mixing
 Salvador Majail – Audio engineer
 Chenet Charles  – Audio engineer

Charts

References

2021 albums
YNW Melly albums